The women's 57 kilograms (Lightweight) competition at the 2014 Asian Games in Incheon was held on 21 September 2014 at the Dowon Gymnasium.

Anzu Yamamoto of Japan won the gold medal.

Schedule
All times are Korea Standard Time (UTC+09:00)

Results

Main bracket

Repechage

References

External links
 
 Official website

W57
Judo at the Asian Games Women's Lightweight
Asian W57